Dvoryanskoye is a rural locality (a selo) in Michurinskoye Rural Settlement, Kamyshinsky District, Volgograd Oblast, Russia. The population was 2,086 as of 2010. There are 8 streets.

Geography 
Dvoryanskoye is located on the Volga Upland, on the left bank of the Ilovlya River, 23 km northwest of Kamyshin (the district's administrative centre) by road. Veselovo is the nearest rural locality.

References 

Rural localities in Kamyshinsky District